The Karirí languages, generally considered dialects of a single language, were a group of languages formerly spoken by the Kiriri people of Brazil. It was spoken until the middle of the 20th century; the 4,000 ethnic Kiriri are now monolingual Portuguese speakers, though a few know common phrases and names of medicinal plants.

History
After the Dutch were expelled from Northeast Brazil in the 17th century, Portuguese settlers rapidly colonized the region, forcing Kariri speakers to become widely dispersed due to forced migrations and resettlement. Hence, Kariri languages became scattered across Paraíba, Ceará, Pernambuco, Bahia, and other states.

Languages
The four known Kariri languages are:
Kipeá (Quipea, Kariri)
Kamurú (Camuru)
Dzubukuá (Dzubucua, Kiriri)
Sabujá (Sapoyá, Pedra Branca)

There are short grammatical descriptions of Kipeá and Dzubukuá, and word lists for Kamurú and Sabujá. Ribeiro established through morphological analysis that Kariri is likely to be related to the Jê languages.

Mason (1950) lists:

Cariri
Kipea
Camurú
Dzubucua
Pedra Branca
Sapuya

Varieties

Below is a full list of Kiriri languages and dialects listed by Loukotka (1968), including names of unattested varieties.

Kariri / Quipea / Cariri - originally spoken in the Serra dos Velhos, Paraíba state, later at the old missions of Missão Velha, Missão Nova, Milagres, Crato, and others, in the states of Paraíba, Pernambuco and Ceará. Now entirely extinct, and the survivors speak only Portuguese.
Kiriri / Dzubucua / Quiriri - extinct language once spoken on the islands of the São Francisco River near Cabrobó, Pernambuco. Now extinct, and the last survivors spoke only Portuguese.
Sapuyá / Sabuya - extinct language originally spoken in the Serra Chapada, later in Caranguejo, Bahia
Kamurú - originally spoken on the Pardo River and in Pedra Branca; the last survivors on the Gongogi River spoke only Portuguese.

Unattested varieties
Iñamum - once spoken on the Inhamum Island of the São Francisco River, Pernambuco. (Unattested)
Quesque - once spoken on the Pajeú River, state of Pernambuco. (Unattested)
Abacatiara - once spoken on an island in the São Francisco River, Pernambuco. (Unattested)
Icozinho - once spoken around the confluence of the Salgado River and Jaguaribe River, Ceará. (Unattested)
Icó - once spoken between the Salgado River, Piranhas River and Peixe River, Ceará. (Unattested)
Calabaça - the Portuguese name of an extinct language of the Salgado River, Ceará. (Unattested)
Cariú - once spoken between the Cariús River and Bastiões River, Ceará. (Unattested)
Corema - formerly spoken on the Piancó River, state of Paraíba. (Unattested)
Jucá - once spoken south of the sources of the Jaguaribe River and near Arneiroz, Ceará. (Unattested)
Ichú / Ansus - once spoken on the sources of the Salgado River in the state of Ceará. (Unattested)
Ariú / Peba - extinct language formerly spoken on the Piranhas River and Sabugi River in the state of Paraíba. (Unattested)
Bultrin - extinct language of the Serra da Borborema of the state of Paraíba. (Unattested)
Quixexeu - once spoken on the Jaguaribe River, Ceará. (Unattested)
Quixelu - once spoken on the Jaguaribe River, Ceará. (Unattested)
Aracapa - extinct language once spoken on Aracapa Island in the São Francisco River, Pernambuco. (Unattested)

Tumbalalá, now extinct, is an unattested and unclassified language, but words for Tumbalalá ritual objects used in their traditional toré religion appear to be of Kariri origin, namely pujá, kwaqui, and cataioba.

Other languages called 'Kariri'

The names Kariri and Kiriri were applied to many peoples over a wide area in the east of Brazil, in the lower and middle São Francisco River area and further north. Most of their now-extinct languages are too poorly known to classify, but what is recorded does not suggest that they were all members of the Kariri family. Examples are:
Katembri (Kiriri, Kariri, Kariri de Mirandela [near Banzaê and Quijingue in Bahia])
Kaufman (1990) classified it as Katembri–Taruma. 
Xukurú (Kirirí, Kirirí-Xokó [in the Serra do Urubá of Pesqueira, Pernambuco])
Loukotka (1968) says this forms a small family with Paratió.
Xocó (Xokó, Chocó [in Sergipe], Kariri-Xocó, Kariri-Shoko, Cariri-Chocó [in Alagoas], Xukuru-Kariri, Xucuru-Kariri, Xucuru-Cariri [in Alagoas])
Three populations. Not clear if this was one language or three. In the Porto Real do Colégio and Palmeira dos Índios areas of Alagoas.

Other nearby language isolates and language families:
Natú (in the area of Porto Real do Colégio, Alagoas)
Wakoná (Aconã) (in Penedo, Alagoas) (unattested)
Wasu (in Joaquim Gomes, Alagoas) (unattested)
Pankararú (in Brejo dos Padres, Tacaratu, Pernambuco)
Tuxá (in Rodelas, Bahia)
Truká (in Cabrobó, Pernambuco) (unattested)
Kapinawá (in Buíque, Pernambuco) (unattested)
Wamoé (Atikum) (in the Serra Negra of Pernambuco and surroundings)
Kambiwá (in Barreira, Petrolândia, Pernambuco)
Yaté (Fulniô) (in Águas Belas, Pernambuco)
Baenan (near Itaju, Bahia)
Kaimbé (in Caimbé, Euclides da Cunha, Bahia)
Kamakã languages (in Bahia and Minas Gerais states)
Masakará (in Massacará, Euclides da Cunha, Bahia and Mirandela, Banzaê, Bahia)
Tarairiú (in Rio Grande do Norte and Ceará states)
Tremembé (in Ceará and surroundings) (unattested)
Gamela (in Viana, Maranhão)

The Maxakalían, Krenák (Botocudo, Aimoré), and Purían families, which are probable Macro-Jê languages, are spoken further to the south in Espirito Santo and Minas Gerais states.

Language contact
Ramirez et al. (2015) notes that Kariri languages display some lexical similarities with Cariban languages. Similarities with Katembri (also known as Kariri of Mirandela or Kaimbé) may be due to either a Kariri superstratum or substratum in Katembri.

Syntax
Unlike most Macro-Jê languages which are SOV, Karirí languages are verb-initial and make use of prepositions.

Vocabulary
Loukotka (1968) lists the following basic vocabulary items for the Kariri languages.

{| class="wikitable sortable"
! gloss !! Quipea !! Dzubucua !! Sapuya !! Kamurú
|-
! ear
| beñe || beñé || penix || benyen
|-
! tooth
| dza || dza || zá || zah
|-
! tongue
| nunu || nunú || nunü || nunuh
|-
! hand
| amísa || musang || musoé || musang
|-
! water
| dzu || isú || dzú || dzu
|-
! stone
| kro || kro ||  || kro
|-
! sun
| ukie || uxe || uché || uchih
|-
! moon
| kayaku || kayakú || gayakú || gayakúh
|-
! star
| bati || bathü || bathü || batthüh
|-
! tree
| bewó || tsi || tsui || 
|-
! tobacco
| badze || paewi || poyú || 
|-
! pot
|  || ruñu ||  || 
|}

Kiriri word list recorded by Wilbur Pickering in 1961 from João Manoel Domingo of Mirandela, Banzaê, Bahia:

{| class="wikitable sortable"
! Portuguese gloss (original) !! English gloss (translated) !! Kiriri
|-
| água || water || soˈdε̨
|-
| barriga || belly || mudu
|-
| cabeça || head || kʌ̨sʌˈbu
|-
| cachorro || dog || poiˈo
|-
| carne de boi || beef || křaˈzɔ
|-
| casa || home || kɔkɔtataˈpʌ̨ιnˈtεu
|-
| cobra || snake || ˈuʌ̨ŋgiu
|-
| dentes || teeth || uiˈsa
|-
| fogo || fire || řuˈɔ infɔiŋkiřiři
|-
| fumo || smoke || boˈze
|-
| língua || tongue || ˈtʌ̨naˈdu
|-
| mandioca || cassava || tokyʌ̨
|-
| milho || corn || paiˈ hεkinikři
|-
| milho verde || green corn || niˈkři
|-
| mulher || woman || tʌ̨nʌˈzu
|-
| nariz || nose || lʌmbiˈzu
|-
| olhos || eyes || uˈipɔ
|-
| onça || jaguar || kosoˈbu inšiˈato
|-
| orelhas || ears || kombεˈñuy
|-
| papagaio || parrot || ɔřoɔ
|-
| perto || near || křaˈbo
|-
| pés || foot || bʌbεiˈu
|-
| sal || salt || ˈįñʌ̨ñį
|-
| sol || sun || buˈzofɔˈši
|-
| sujo || dirty || ikřε
|-
| velho || old || šiˈbɔ
|-
| abóbora || pumpkin || křuñaˈvɔ
|-
| (está) alegre || (be) happy || sιsιˈkři
|-
| andar no mato || go into the bush || dořoˈřo
|-
| ave (arapuá) || type of bird || kakiki
|-
| ave (inambu) || tinamou || hoiˈpa
|-
| batata || potato || břuziˈřundada
|-
| bater (?) || hit (?) || dɔˈpɔ
|-
| branco || white || ˈkařai
|-
| cachimbo || smoking pipe || paˈu
|-
| camaleão || chameleon || bodoˈyo
|-
| carregado || loaded || pεdiˈpi
|-
| cavalo || horse || kabaˈřu
|-
| comida gostosa || delicious food || duˈhε
|-
| coxa || thigh || ˈkokulˈdu
|-
| criação || creation || buzuřu
|-
| cutia || agouti || foiˈpřu
|-
| dedos || fingers || poˈmɔdoˈi
|-
| deus || God || tuˈpo
|-
| dinheiro || money || kεiˈu
|-
| ema || rhea || buˈʌ̨
|-
| faca (arco?) || knife (bow?) || uˈza
|-
| feijão || bean || břuˈzohɔˈši
|-
| um tipo de fruta || a type of fruit || com
|-
| miolo || core || kɔˈpε
|-
| gato || cat || pʌñ̨ ɔ ̨
|-
| índio || Indian || ʌ̨ˈį
|-
| jabuti || red-footed tortoise or yellow-footed tortoise || samˈbo
|-
| jacu (ave) || jacu (Penelope bird) || kakika
|-
| joelho || knee || kɔkabεkε
|-
| maltrapilho || person wearing shabby clothes || hundiřɔ
|-
| manco || lame || uʌnˈtyɔ
|-
| melão || melon || přεˈzεnuda
|-
| mentira || lie (not truth) || zoˈpřε
|-
| muita gente || many people || dodoˈši
|-
| muito obrigado || Thank you very much. || buřεˈdu poio
|-
| mulher bonita || beautiful woman || kařabuˈšε
|-
| peba || drink || bεˈřɔ
|-
| peneirar || sift || koha
|-
| pessoa amarela || yellow person || křuaˈřʌ̨
|-
| pessoa vermelha || red person || bεřoˈhε
|-
| pestana || eyelash || pʌ̨nadu
|-
| preto || black || šεŋˈgε
|-
| quadril || hip || kaiuˈε
|-
| quati || coati || ˈbizaui
|-
| quente || hot || daˈsả
|-
| raposa || fox || iaˈka
|-
| raso || shallow || ˈtařořo
|-
| sacola || bag || doˈbε
|-
| sene || senile || bɔdɔkɔpři
|-
| surdo || deaf || ˈbεñamu
|-
| tamanduá || tamandua || iaˈzu
|-
| tatu || armadillo || ˈbuzuku
|-
| urubu || vulture || ˈkikɔ
|-
| veado || deer || buko
|-
| verdade || truth || fiˈzo
|-
| à vontade || make yourself at home || nεˈta
|-
| (está) zangado || (be) angry || pɔkεˈdε
|}

Loanwords
Eastern Macro-Jê loanwords in Kariri languages:

{| class="wikitable sortable"
! gloss !! Kipeá !! Dzubukuá !! other languages
|-
| beans || ghinhé || guenhie || giñá (Kotoxó)
|-
| hammock || pité || pitta || pita (Coroado)
|-
| Black person || gorá ||  || engorá (Krenák)
|-
| swamp, marsh || pôhô ||  || pohok (Maxakalí)
|-
| cow, cattle || cradzó || cradzo || krazo ‘tapir’ (Masakará)
|-
| tobacco || badzé || badze || bosé ‘tobacco pipe’ (Coroado)
|}

Tupinambá loanwords in Kariri languages:

{| class="wikitable sortable"
! gloss !! Kipeá !! Dzubukuá !! Tupinambá !! other Eastern Macro-Jê languages
|-
| needle || awí ||  || abi || Maxakalí ãmix
|-
| banana || bacobá ||  || pacova || Coroado bacóba
|-
| White person || caraí || carai || caraíba || Iatê klai, Krenák krai
|-
| box || cramemú ||  || caramẽmuã || 
|-
| domestic pig || curé ||  || curê || Krenák kurek
|-
| pumpkin || erumú ||  || jurumũ, jeremũ || Purí šurumúm ‘potato’
|-
| bread || miapé ||  || miapé || 
|-
| beads || myghý || muihi || mboýra || 
|-
| oil || nhendí || nianddi || nhandy || 
|-
| bench || pycá ||  || apycába || 
|-
| chicken, hen || sabucá || dapuca || (güyra)ssapucáia || 
|-
| Black person || tapanhú || tapwinhiu || tapyyiúna || Coroado tabañiú, Makoni tapagnon, Malalí tapagnon
|-
| Black person ||  ||  || tapyýia || Iatê tupia
|-
| hoe || tasí ||  || itassýra || Maxakalí taxunna
|-
| money || tayú || tayu || itajúba || Maxakalí tayũmak
|-
| God || tupã || tupam || tupã || Maxakalí topa, Krenák kupan, Coroado tupan
|-
| priest || waré || padzuare || abaré || Maxakalí ãmãnex, Macuni amattèih, Coroado uáre, Masakará ampari
|-
| mirror || waruá ||  || guaruguá || 
|-
| sugarcane mill || wirapararã ||  || ybyrapararánga || 
|-
| firearm ||  ||  || mbocaba || Coroado bokawa
|-
| manioc tortilla ||  ||  || mbeju || Coroado bišu ‘manioc’
|-
| cow, cattle ||  ||  || tapiira || Coroado tapira, Malalí tapiet
|-
| maize ||  ||  || abati || Krenák javati
|-
| demon ||  ||  || anhanga, anhangüera || Coroado nhawuera
|-
| dog ||  ||  || jaguara || Coroado džoàra
|}

Portuguese loanwords in Kariri languages borrowed via Tupinambá and other intermediate sources:

{| class="wikitable sortable"
! gloss !! Kipeá !! Dzubukuá !! Possible intermediate sources !! Portuguese !! other Macro-Jê languages
|-
| goat || cabará || cabara || cabará (Tupinambá) || cabra || 
|-
| horse || cabarú ||  || cavarú (Tupinambá) || cavalo || Coroado kawarú, Cotoxó cavaró
|-
| cross || crusá || crudzá || curussá (Tupinambá) || cruz || Iatê klusa
|-
| devil || nhewó || niẽwo || niñavoo (Kapoxó) || diabo || 
|-
| paper ||  ||  || papera || papel || Iatê wapela, Coroado tapera
|}

Further reading
Rodrigues, A. D. (1942). O Artigo Definido e os Numerais na Língua Kiriri. Arquivos do Museu Paranaense, 2:179-212.

References

Notes
Ribeiro, Eduardo. (2002) 'O marcador de posse alienavel em Kariri: um morfema macro-je revisitado'. Revista Liames, 2: 31-48.
Fabre, Alain. 2005. Diccionario etnolingüístico y guía bibliográfica de los pueblos indígenas sudamericanos: KARIRI

 
Macro-Jê languages
Indigenous languages of Northeastern Brazil
Extinct languages of South America
Language families